Fritz Weinzinger (14 July 1890 – 22 May 1963) was an Austrian sprinter. He competed in the men's 100 metres at the 1912 Summer Olympics.

References

1890 births
1963 deaths
Athletes (track and field) at the 1912 Summer Olympics
Austrian male sprinters
Olympic athletes of Austria